Carolyn Pickles (born 8 February 1952) is an English actress who has appeared in West End theatre and on British television. She is known for playing DCI Kim Reid in The Bill and Shelley Williams in Emmerdale.

Life and career
Pickles was born in Wakefield, West Yorkshire. She lives in north London. She is the daughter of the Circuit Judge James Pickles, a niece of actress Christina Pickles, and great-niece of Wilfred Pickles, the TV and radio personality. Pickles grew up in and attended school in Halifax in West Yorkshire. She read drama at the University of Manchester, taking roles in a number of student productions including Narrow Road to the Deep North by Edward Bond, and the lead in Brecht's Mother Courage and Her Children.  She joined the BBC's Radio Drama Company.

Pickles played the lead role as Miss Bluebell in the BBC series of the same name, based on the career of Margaret Kelly Leibovici, in 1986. She also appeared in The Bill for two years as DCI Kim Reid, as Simone Trevelyan in May to December and in The Tales of Para Handy as Lady Catherine Ramsay. Pickles also appeared in the cult BBC children's educational drama series Through The Dragon's Eye. She was a leading character (12 episodes in 1982) in the TV series We'll Meet Again. Pickles has appeared in a number of films, including Roman Polanski's Tess (1979), Agatha (1979) and The Mirror Crack'd (1980). In 1995 she played as Linda Livingstone in I Don't Speak English with Paolo Villaggio. Pickles appeared in Harry Potter and the Deathly Hallows – Part 1 as the Muggle Studies teacher, Charity Burbage. In 2006 she played the part of Jane Templeton in the final episode of the first series of Lewis an ITV drama.

In 2011, Carolyn Pickles played Mrs Gulliver in Series 2 and 3 of Land Girls.  In 2013, Pickles played journalist Maggie Radcliffe in the ITV drama Broadchurch. She appeared in all 3 series, from 2013–2017.

She has two daughters, one of whom is actress Lucy Pickles.

In 2018, Pickles recorded a two-part interview for The Bill Podcast celebrating her life and career.

In December 2021, Carolyn appeared in Tesco's Christmas campaign

In 2022 she appears as Reverend Mother Adrian in Sister Boniface Mysteries'' in a recurring role.

References

External links
 

1952 births
Alumni of the University of Manchester
English film actresses
English soap opera actresses
English television actresses
Living people
Actors from Wakefield
Actresses from Yorkshire
20th-century English actresses
21st-century English actresses
English stage actresses